King of Clubs is the debut solo album by Paul Gilbert formerly of the heavy metal band Racer X and the hard rock band Mr. Big.

Track listing
All songs written by Paul Gilbert except where noted.
 "Champagne" – 3:20
 "Vinyl" – 3:36
 "Girls Who Can Read Your Mind" – 3:30
 "I'm Just In Love" – 1:56
 "The Jig" (Instrumental) – 2:24 (J. S. Bach)
 "Girlfriend's Birthday" – 2:59
 "Bumblebee" – 4:22
 "Streetlights" – 4:57
 "My Naomi" – 4:21
 "Double Trouble" – 3:07
 "Million Dollar Smile" – 2:19
 "The Jam" (Instrumental) – 19:35
 "I Do" 2:59
Track 5 arranged by Paul Gilbert.
Track 13 only available on the Japan release of the album.

Musicians
 Paul Gilbert – vocals, guitars, piano, organ, bass guitar, tambourine and drums on track 4
 Pat Torpey – drums (Tracks 1 & 7)
 Jeff Martin – drums (Tracks 2-3, 5-6 & 8-12)
 Bruce Bouillet – Guitar (Track 12)
 John Alderete – Bass guitar (Track 12)

Production
 Bruce Bouillet - Mixing, Producer, Engineer
 Chris Bellman - Mastering

References

External links
Heavy Harmonies page

Paul Gilbert albums
1998 debut albums